Louna is an alternative/punk rock band, formed in Moscow in 2008 by Tracktor Bowling musicians Lousine Gevorkian and Vitaly Demidenko.

Their debut album, Let's Get Louder, was released in 2010.  In total, the group has released three albums and six singles to date.

The band is best known for its socially conscious songs criticizing Russian political elites and religion. Louna's songs are frequently found on Russian radio and rock charts.

Louna is composed of members Lousine Gevorkian (vocals), Vitaly Demidenko (bass), Sergey Ponkratiev (guitars), Rouben Kazariyan (guitar) and Leonid "Pilot" Kinzbursky (drums).

In autumn 2013 the band went into a large-scale tour of 26 U.S. cities with teams of The Pretty Reckless and Heaven's Basement.

On 13 December 2018 they released a new English-speaking album, “Panopticon”.

Awards and nominations 

|-
|rowspan="1"| 2009 ||rowspan="1"| Louna || Best New Alternative Artist  || 
|-
|rowspan="3"| 2011 ||rowspan="3"| Louna || Song of the Year "Fight Club"  || 
|-
| Female Vocalist "Lousine Gevorkian"  || 
|-
| Breakthrough Artist "Louna"  || 
|-
|rowspan="2"| 2012 ||rowspan="2"| Louna || Female Vocalist "Lousine Gevorkian"  || 
|-
| Album of the Year "Time X"  || 
|-
|rowspan="2"| 2014 ||rowspan="2"| Louna || 500 Best songs Nashe Radio "Mama", "Let's Get Louder"   || 
|-
| Group of the Year "Louna"   || 
|-
|rowspan="1"| 2014 ||rowspan="1"| Lousine Gevorkian || Leader chart "Tarakany! and Lousine Gevorkian"   || 
|-

Band members

Current members
Lousine Gevorkian — lead vocals, keyboards (2008–present)
Vitaly Demidenko — bass guitar (2008–present)
Rouben Kazariyan — lead guitar (2008–present)
Sergey Ponkratiev — rhythm guitar (2008–present)
Leonid Kinzbursky — drums (2008–present)

Timeline

Discography

Albums, Singles, DVD

Videography

Sources

External links

 
 
 Page @ last.fm (more than 11.000 listeners)

See also 
 Tracktor Bowling
 Lousine Gevorkian
 Vitaly Demidenko

2008 establishments in Russia
Musical groups from Moscow
Musical groups established in 2008
Russian alternative metal musical groups
Russian activists against the 2022 Russian invasion of Ukraine